Max & Shred is a comedy television series produced by Breakthrough Entertainment in Canada, with Nickelodeon and YTV involvement throughout the production process. It was created by Josh Greenbaum and Ben McMillan. The series aired on YTV in Canada. In the United States, the series aired on Nickelodeon from October 6, 2014 to July 11, 2015, before moving to Nicktoons from March 21 to March 31, 2016. The series stars Jonny Gray, Jake Goodman, Saara Chaudry, Emilia McCarthy, Jean-Michel Le Gal, and Siobhan Murphy.

Premise 
The series chronicles the comedic and unlikely friendship between Max Asher, a celebrity snowboarder, and Alvin "Shred" Ackerman, a science whiz-child, who become roommates and instant friends when Max moves to Colorado to train for the Winter Cup.

Cast

Main 
 Jonny Gray as Max Asher
 Jake Goodman as Alvin "Shred" Ackerman
 Saara Chaudry as Jill "Howie" Finch
 Emilia McCarthy as Abby Ackerman
 Jean-Michel Le Gal as Lloyd Ackerman
 Siobhan Murphy as Diane Ackerman

Recurring 
 Tucker Bowman as Junk
 Hannah Cheesman as Kaylee Carpenter
 Stephen Joffe as Peter
 Devyn Nekoda as Wendy Chong
 Amariah Faulkner as Juliet
 Katie Douglas as Melanie

Production 
The series was created by Josh Greenbaum and Ben McMillan, and was executive produced by George Doty IV, along with Joan Lambur, Ira Levy, Peter Williamson, Nat Abraham and Michael McGuigan. It was produced by Toronto's Breakthrough Entertainment, with Nickelodeon and YTV involvement throughout the production process, and support from the Shaw Rocket Fund. On February 25, 2015, it was announced that the series was renewed for a second season.

Episodes

Series overview

Season 1 (2014–15)

Season 2 (2016)

Broadcast 
In Canada, the series aired on YTV. In the United States, the series' first season aired on Nickelodeon from October 6, 2014 to July 11, 2015, while the second season premiered on Nicktoons on March 21, and aired through March 31, 2016. In Australia, the series began airing on Nickelodeon on January 17, 2015.

Reception

Ratings 
 

| link2             = #Season 2 (2016)
| network2          = Nicktoons
| episodes2         = 8
| start2            = 
| end2              = 
| startrating2      = 0.13
| endrating2        = 0.13
| viewers2          = |2}} 
}}

Awards and nominations 
At the 4th Canadian Screen Awards, the series was nominated for Best Children's or Youth Fiction Program or Series.

References

External links 
 

YTV (Canadian TV channel) original programming
2010s Canadian comedy television series
2010s Nickelodeon original programming
2014 Canadian television series debuts
2016 Canadian television series endings
English-language television shows